My Love Has Been Burning is a 1949 Japanese historical drama film directed by Kenji Mizoguchi. It is loosely based on the life of feminist Hideko Fukuda.

Plot
After meeting with Meiji era feminist and Liberal Party member Toshiko Kishida, the school of young teacher Eiko in Okayama is closed by the prefecture officials. She leaves her oppressive environment for Tokyo, following her boyfriend Hayase, but Hayase acts reserved when she reunites with him. Omoi, a prominent Liberal Party politician, offers her a job at the party's newspaper. When Hayase is caught spying on the party for the government, she breaks ties with him and becomes Omoi's lover.

Eiko and Omoi are arrested during the turmoils of the Chichibu incident and sentenced to several years' imprisonment, where Eiko witnesses the same abuse of the female inmates as before of the women labourers in the textile mills. After the 1889 amnesty of political prisoners, Omoi regroups the party, supported by Eiko. When Eiko is confronted with Omoi's adulterous behaviour, which he blatantly asks her to accept, she realises that he too still nurtures an attitude of male preeminence. She announces to leave him and return to Okayama to establish a school for young women, convinced that only proper education can lead to female liberation.

Cast
 Kinuyo Tanaka as Eiko Hirayama
 Mitsuko Mito as Chiyo
 Kuniko Miyake as Toshiko Kishida
 Ichirō Sugai as Kentarō Omoi
 Shinobu Araki as Eiko's father
 Sadako Sawamura as Governor
 Eitarō Ozawa as Hayase
 Koreya Senda as Inagaki
 Eijirō Tōno as Ito

Reception
In his Critical Handbook of Japanese Film Directors, film scholar Alexander Jacoby rated Flame of My Love as one of "Mizoguchi's most outspoken films" and a "startling trenchant study of female emancipation" whose conclusion "remains unparalleled in Western popular film".

References

External links
 

1949 films
1949 drama films
Japanese drama films
Japanese black-and-white films
Films directed by Kenji Mizoguchi
Films set in Tokyo
1940s Japanese-language films